As Burgas are hot springs in the historic center of Ourense, in Galicia, Spain. They include Burga do Medio, which is infused with gas, Burga de Arriba and a Burga de Abaixo. The waters are similar to those of Carlsbad, and gush from granite rock to the west of the town at almost the boiling point. The hot mineral waters gush at 80 gallons per minute.

Thermal pool 
On July 28, 2010, the new thermal pool was inaugurated in Burga do Medio, designed by Galician architect César Portela.

References

External links

 Information about the termal pool 

Geography of the Province of Ourense
Hot springs
Ourense
Galician culture